David Zimmerhofer (born 30 August 1995) is an Italian football player. He plays for SSV Ahrntal.

Club career
He made his Austrian Football First League debut for WSG Wattens on 22 July 2016 in a game against FC Blau-Weiß Linz.

References

External links
 

1995 births
Sportspeople from Bolzano
Living people
Italian footballers
F.C. Südtirol players
A.C. Sambonifacese players
Serie D players
WSG Tirol players
Italian expatriate footballers
Expatriate footballers in Austria
2. Liga (Austria) players
Association football defenders
Footballers from Trentino-Alto Adige/Südtirol